Vice-Admiral Sir William Gladstone Agnew  (2 December 1898 – 12 July 1960) was an officer of the Royal Navy. He served during the First and Second World Wars, and rose to the rank of vice-admiral.

Agnew was the fifth son of Charles Morland Agnew and Evelyn Mary Agnew, née Naylor. Agnew was educated at Royal Naval College, Osborne, and at Britannia Royal Naval College, Dartmouth, joining the Navy in 1911. During the inter war years Agnew served aboard  and as gunnery officer aboard .

In October 1940 he was transferred to the cruiser  as commanding officer. Commodore Agnew commanded Force K during the destruction of the Duisburg convoy on 8 November 1941 and was appointed a Companion of the Order of the Bath for this action. In June 1943 the Aurora was used to convey King George VI to Malta and Agnew was created a Companion of the Royal Victorian Order for this service.

On conclusion of the tour he was appointed Knight Commander of the Royal Victorian Order. In August 1947 Agnew was appointed director of personnel services at the Admiralty, where he remained until October 1949. In January 1950 he retired from the navy at his own request, and later in the year was promoted to vice-admiral on the retired list.

After retirement from the navy he was General Secretary of the National Playing Fields Association, from 1950 to 1953, and was also active in local government.

Agnew married Patricia Caroline Bewley in 1930. They had no children. At the time of his death he was living at Glentimon, Palmerston Way, Alverstoke, Hampshire.

References

1898 births
1960 deaths
William
Military personnel from London
Royal Navy admirals of World War II
Graduates of Britannia Royal Naval College
Royal Navy officers of World War I
Companions of the Order of the Bath
Companions of the Distinguished Service Order
Knights Commander of the Royal Victorian Order
English cricketers
Royal Navy cricketers
People educated at the Royal Naval College, Osborne